Mario Alberto Becerra Pocoroba (born 10 August 1955) is a Mexican lawyer and politician from the National Action Party. From 2009 to 2012 he served as Deputy of the LXI Legislature of the Mexican Congress representing Guerrero.

References

1955 births
Living people
Politicians from Mexico City
20th-century Mexican lawyers
National Action Party (Mexico) politicians
21st-century Mexican politicians
Deputies of the LXI Legislature of Mexico
Members of the Chamber of Deputies (Mexico) for Guerrero
21st-century Mexican lawyers